The European Food Safety Authority (EFSA) is the agency of the European Union (EU) that provides independent scientific advice and communicates on existing and emerging risks associated with the food chain. EFSA was established in February 2002, is based in Parma, Italy, and for 2021 it has a budget of €118.6 million, and a total staff of 542.

The work of EFSA covers all matters with a direct or indirect impact on food and feed safety, including animal health and welfare, plant protection and plant health and nutrition. EFSA supports the European Commission, the European Parliament and EU member states in taking effective and timely risk management decisions that ensure the protection of the health of European consumers and the safety of the food and feed chain. EFSA also communicates to the public in an open and transparent way on all matters within its remit.

Structure 
Based on a regulation of 2002, the EFSA is composed of four bodies:
 Management Board
 Executive Director
 Advisory Forum
 Scientific Committee and Scientific Panels

The Management Board sets the budget, approves work programmes, and is responsible for ensuring that EFSA co-operates successfully with partner organisations across the EU and beyond. It is composed of fourteen members appointed by the Council of the European Union in consultation with the European Parliament from a list drawn up by the European Commission, plus one representative of the European Commission.

The Executive Director is EFSA's legal representative and is responsible for day-to-day administration, drafting and implementing work programmes, and implementing other decisions adopted by the Management Board. They are appointed by the Management Board.

The Advisory Forum advises the Executive Director, in particular in drafting a proposal for the EFSA's work programmes. It is composed of representatives of national bodies responsible for risk assessment in the Member States, with observers from Norway, Iceland, Switzerland and the European Commission.

The Scientific Committee and its Scientific Panels provide scientific opinions and advice, each within their own sphere of competence, and are composed of independent scientific experts. The number and names of the Scientific Panels are adapted in the light of technical and scientific development by the European Commission at EFSA's request. The independent scientific experts are appointed by the Management Board upon a proposal from the Executive Director for three-year terms.

Focal Point network 
The EFSA cooperates with the national food safety authorities of the 27 EU member states, Iceland and Norway, as well as observers from Switzerland and EU candidate countries, through its Focal Points, who also communicate with research institutes and other stakeholders. They "assist in the exchange of scientific information and experts, advise on cooperation activities and scientific projects, promote training in risk assessment and raise EFSA's scientific visibility and outreach in Member States."

Members 
The following countries' national food safety authorities are members of the EFSA Focal Point network:

Observers 
The following countries' national food safety authorities are observers of the EFSA Focal Point network:

Journal
The scientific output of the European Food Safety Authority is published in the EFSA Journal, an open-access, online scientific journal. This concerns risk assessment in relation to food and feed and includes nutrition, animal health and welfare, plant health and plant protection.

Criticism 

The EFSA has been criticised for its alleged "overregulation".

Conflicts of interests 

The EFSA has been criticised, including by the European Court of Auditors in 2012, for "frequent conflicts of interests", some of them undeclared. A number of undisclosed conflicts of interest involved the International Life Sciences Institute.

According to Corporate Europe Observatory, in 2013, 58% of the experts of the agency were in situation of conflict of interests. In 2017, they were still 46% in situation of conflict of interests.

Controversy 

EFSA has also been criticised by the NGO CHEM Trust for misrepresenting the results of their expert committee's report on bisphenol A (BPA) in January 2015. EFSA claimed in the abstract, press release and briefing that bisphenol A 'posed no risk' to health, when the expert report actually stated the risk was 'low' when considering aggregate exposure (beyond just food). EFSA later modified the abstract to correct this error, though the press release remains unchanged. EFSA have argued that use of 'no health concern' in their press release and bisphenol A briefing is to ensure these materials are accessible, though this rationale is disputed by CHEM Trust.

See also 

 Agriculture and Fisheries Council (Council of the European Union)
 Directorate-General for Agriculture, Fisheries, Social Affairs and Health
 Employment, Social Policy, Health and Consumer Affairs Council (Council of the European Union)
 EU-Eco-regulation
 European Commissioner for Health
 Directorate-General for Health and Consumers
 European Parliament Committee on the Environment, Public Health and Food Safety
 Health mark
 List of food safety organisations
 Rapid Alert System for Food and Feed
 Regulation of genetically modified organisms in the European Union
 The European Consumer Organisation

References

External links
 
 
 Health-EU public health portal of the Directorate-General for Health and Consumers
 EFSA Journal

2002 establishments in Italy
2002 in the European Union
Agencies of the European Union
Food safety organizations
Government agencies established in 2002
Food safety in the European Union
International organisations based in Italy
Parma
Regulation in the European Union
Phytosanitary authorities